Below is a list of current Oceania Swimming Championships records as ratified by the Oceania Swimming Association.

Of the 38 events, Australia currently holds records in 21 of them, New Zealand 16 and Papua New Guinea 1.

Going into the 2010 Championships, one record set at the inaugural Championships still stood: Rebecca Brown's 2:28.24 in 200 m breaststroke. On the final night of the 2010 Championships, Australia's Rebecca Kemp broke Brown's 17-year-old record, lowering the mark to 2:26.63.

Men's events

Women's events

Mixed relay

References

External links
 Oceanian Swimming Association - Oceania Swimming Championship records 
 2008 Oceania Swimming Championship results
 2006 Oceania Swimming Championship results
 2004 Oceania Swimming Championship results

Oceania championships
Records
Records